Trecase  is a comune (municipality) in the Metropolitan City of Naples  in the Italian region Campania, located about  southeast of Naples.

Trecase borders the following municipalities: Boscotrecase, Ercolano, Ottaviano, Torre Annunziata, Torre del Greco.

References

Cities and towns in Campania